Retroculus is a genus of cichlids native to tropical South America, where three are native to rivers in southeastern Amazon Basin in Brazil, while the final is native to rivers in Amapá (Brazil) and French Guiana. It is the sole genus included in the subfamily Retroculinae, although some authorities classify this as a tribe, Retroculini, of the subfamily Cichlinae. These rheophilic cichlids are superficially similar to Geophagus.

Species
Four recognized species are in this genus:
 Retroculus acherontos Landim, C. L. R. Moreira & C. A. Figueiredo, 2015
 Retroculus lapidifer (Castelnau, 1855)
 Retroculus septentrionalis J. P. Gosse, 1971
 Retroculus xinguensis J. P. Gosse, 1971

References

Cichlid fish of South America
Freshwater fish genera
Cichlid genera
Taxa named by Carl H. Eigenmann
Taxa named by William L. Bray